USS Eutaw was a  Sassacus-class "double-ender" steam gunboat built at Baltimore, Maryland by J. J. Abrahams. It was commissioned on 2 July 1863, Lieutenant Commander Homer C. Blake in command.

Service history
Assigned to the North Atlantic Blockading Squadron, USS Eutaw spent most of the American Civil War operating on the Potomac and James Rivers and along the Atlantic coast. On 4–5 May 1864, she covered the Army as it landed below City Point, Virginia; and on 14 July and 17 July, bombarded the Confederates at Malvern Hill.

In 1865, with the war nearly at an end, Eutaw went to New York City on 26 April, where she was decommissioned on 8 May and sold on October 15, 1867.

References

 

Ships built in Baltimore
Ships of the Union Navy
1863 ships
Sassacus-class gunboats